Rainbow Lake Airport  is located adjacent to Rainbow Lake, Alberta, Canada.

References

External links
Place to Fly on COPA's Places to Fly airport directory

Certified airports in Alberta